The 2001 UC Davis football team represented the University of California, Davis as an independent during the 2001 NCAA Division II football season. Led by ninth-year head coach Bob Biggs, UC Davis compiled an overall record of 10–3. 2001 was the 32nd consecutive winning season for the Aggies. UC Davis was ranked No. 12 in the NCAA Division II poll at the end of the regular season and advanced to the NCAA Division II Football Championship playoffs for the sixth straight year. The Aggies defeated 11th-ranked  in the first round and 17th-ranked  in the quarterfinals before losing in semifinal round to fourth-ranked and eventual national champion North Dakota. The team outscored their opponents 490 to 286 for the season. The Aggies played home games at Toomey Field in Davis, California.

Schedule

NFL Draft
The following UC Davis Aggies players were selected in the 2002 NFL Draft.

References

UC Davis
UC Davis Aggies football seasons
UC Davis Aggies football